Hapoel Haifa Football Club is an Israeli football club located in Haifa. During the 2020–21 campaignthe club have competed in the Israeli Premier League, State Cup and Toto Cup.

Club

Kits

 Provider: Diadora
 Main Sponsor: Moked Hat'ama
 Secondary Sponsor:  Garden Events

First team

Transfers

Summer

In:

Out:

Winter

In:

Out:

Pre-season and friendlies

Competitions

Overview

Ligat Ha'Al

Results summary

Results by matchday

Regular season

Regular season table

Results overview

Play-off

Relegation round table

Results overview

State Cup

Round of 32

Round of 16

Toto Cup

Group stage

13-14th classification match

Statistics

Appearances and goals

|-
|colspan="12"|Players away from Hapoel Haifa on loan:
|-

|-

|-

|-
|colspan="12"|Players who appeared for Hapoel Haifa that left during the season:
|-

|-

|-

|-

|-

|-

|-
|}

Goalscorers

Last updated: 12 May 2019

Assists

Last updated: 12 May 2019

Clean sheets

Updated on 12 May 2019

Disciplinary record

Updated on 12 May 2019

Suspensions

Updated on 12 May 2019

Penalties

Updated on 12 May 2019

Overall

{| class="wikitable" style="text-align: center"
|-
!
!Total
!Home
!Away
!Natural
|-
|align=left| Games played          || 39 || 20 || 19 || 0
|-
|align=left| Games won             || 11 || 7 || 4 || 
|- 
|align=left| Games drawn           || 11 || 5 || 6 || 
|-
|align=left| Games lost             || 17 || 8 || 9 || 
|-
|align=left| Biggest win             || 3 - 1 vs Beitar Jerusalem || 3 - 1 vs Beitar Jerusalem || 2 - 0 vs Bnei Yehuda Tel Aviv2 - 0 vs Hapoel Tel Aviv || 
|-
|align=left| Biggest loss       || 0 - 3 vs Hapoel Hadera || 1 - 3 vs Bnei Yehuda Tel Aviv || 0 - 3 vs Hapoel Hadera || 
|-
|align=left| Biggest win (League)    || 3 - 1 vs Beitar Jerusalem || 3 - 1 vs Beitar Jerusalem || 2 - 0 vs Bnei Yehuda Tel Aviv2 - 0 vs Hapoel Tel Aviv || 
|-
|align=left| Biggest loss (League)   || 0 - 3 vs Hapoel Hadera || 1 - 3 vs Bnei Yehuda Tel Aviv || 0 - 3 vs Hapoel Hadera || 
|-
|align=left| Biggest win (Cup)    ||  ||  ||  || 
|-
|align=left| Biggest loss (Cup)     || 2 - 3 vs Maccabi Tel Aviv || 2 - 3 vs Maccabi Tel Aviv ||  || 
|-
|align=left| Biggest win (Toto)    ||  ||  ||  || 
|-
|align=left| Biggest loss (Toto)   || 2 - 4 vs Hapoel Hadera || 0 - 2 vs Bnei Sakhnin || 2 - 4 vs Hapoel Hadera || 
|-
|align=left| Goals scored           || 49 || 25 || 24 || 
|-
|align=left| Goals conceded         || 63 || 29 || 34 || 
|-
|align=left| Goal difference        || -14 || -4 || -10 || 
|-
|align=left| Clean sheets            || 9 || 4 || 5 || 
|-
|--
|-
|align=left| Yellow cards          || 88 || 51 || 37 || 
|-
|align=left| Red cards               || 5 || 4 || 1 || 
|-
|align=left| Most appearances      ||colspan=4|  Sa'ar Fadida (36)
|-
|align=left| Most goals        ||colspan=4|  Hanan Maman (9)
|-
|align=left| Most Assist        ||colspan=4|  William Agada (6)
|-
|align=left| Penalties for   || 5 || 2 || 3 || 
|-
|align=left| Penalties against   || 9 || 5 || 4 || 
|-
|align=left| Winning rate         || % || % || % || 
|-

References

Hapoel Haifa F.C. seasons
Hapoel Haifa